AudioMulch is modular audio software for making music and processing sound. The software can synthesize sound and process live and pre-recorded sound in real-time.

AudioMulch has a patcher-style graphical user interface, in which modules called contraptions can be connected together to route audio and process sounds. Included are modules used in electronic dance music such as a bassline-style synthesizer and a drum machine, effects like ring modulation, flanging, reverb and delays, and other modules such as a delay-line granulator and stereo spatializer. As well as these internal contraptions, AudioMulch supports VST and VSTi plugins.

History

Origins of AudioMulch

AudioMulch grew out of musician Ross Bencina's performance practice in the mid-1990s. At this time, live, computer-based sound processing systems were often expensive and restricted to use within research institutions. By 1995 however, the processing capabilities of the personal computer were sufficient that Bencina was able to create OverSYTE, a real-time performance granulator. OverSYTE was used by Bencina to process sound in his real-time performances with vocalists and instrumental musicians. AudioMulch grew out of the limitations of OverSYTE, which could process only one sound at a time. In contrast, AudioMulch can process multiple sounds sources at once.

Development of AudioMulch

AudioMulch has been in development since 1997. The first release made available for download on the Internet was beta version 0.7b1, in March 1998. There were 36 Beta releases prior to Version 1.0 of the software, which was released in February 2006. 
AudioMulch 1.0 was developed for Microsoft Windows in the C++ programming language, using the Borland C++ Builder development environment.

Version 1.0

Version 1.0 was released on 21 February 2006.

Version 2.0

AudioMulch 2.0 was released 5 June 2009. According to the website, this version is available for both Windows and Macintosh computers.

Version 2.1

Version 2.1 was released 4 August 2010. Version 2.1 supports custom time signatures, Audio Unit plugin support on Mac OS X, dynamic processing contraptions, and an alternate light gray color scheme.

Features

AudioMulch 1.0 features

 An interactive user-interface with three main panes:
 a patcher for routing audio between contraptions
 a pane containing control panels for each contraption
 an automation timeline supporting automation of contraption parameters
 Support for real-time sound-processing and performance.
 24 channels of real-time input/output. 
 Multi-channel recording and playback of multiple sound files.
 Contraptions including signal generators, effects, filters and mixers.
 Input sound can be taken from sound files or real-time audio input. 
 Output is heard in real-time and can be simultaneously recorded to a sound file.
 Any processing parameter in AudioMulch can be controlled by MIDI. This includes the use of external hardware such as knob boxes, gaming controllers, virtual reality gloves and custom control devices.

AudioMulch 2.0 features

 A new Patcher with advanced drag-and-drop patching and MIDI routing
 MIDI and automation control for Clock transport (tempo, stop, start) and Metasurface interpolation. 
 Enhanced Drums contraption with 8 channels and a new pattern editor supporting arbitrary length high-resolution patterns
 Expanded multichannel audio I/O capability to support up to 256 channels in each direction and improved compatibility with consumer multichannel audio interfaces using DirectSound and Windows Multimedia drivers.

Future

As outlined in AudioMulch's road map, future versions should bring new sound mangling, filtering and resonating contraptions, an overhauled undo system, 3rd party host integration and performance modulation, as well as further enhancements to existing sound and keyboard controls.

As of August, 2022, the long promised 64-bit compatible version of AudioMulch has not been released and the website is no longer available. As near as anyone can tell, AudioMulch is effectively abandon-ware.

Musicians that use or have used AudioMulch

 Nine Inch Nails
 Girl Talk
 Four Tet
 Lackluster
 Erdem Helvacioglu 
 Shitmat 
 Pimmon
 Tim Hecker

The discography on the AudioMulch website has a list of other artists that have used AudioMulch in commercial releases.

See also

 Granular synthesis
 Modular synthesizer
 Computer music

Notes

References
  AudioMulch website – info page. Retrieved on 2009-01-28
  AudioMulch website – discography. Retrieved on 2009-01-28
  Clatterbox website. Retrieved on 2009-01-28
 Dugan, S. (2006), "Girl Talk". In Remix Magazine, 1 December 2006.  Retrieved on 2009-01-28
  (2008) "Girl Talk/Gregg Gillis on New Album/Music Industry". In The Washington Post, 29 July 2008.  Retrieved on 2009-01-28
 Inglis, S. (2003), "FourTet – Kieran Hebden: Recording Rounds". In Sound on Sound, July 2003.  Retrieved on 2009-01-28
 Hsieh, C. (2005), "Audio Anarchy". In Remix Magazine, 1 June 2005.  Retrieved on 2009-01-28
 Interview with the Nine Inch Nails by Greg Rule, Keyboard Magazine, February 2000.  Retrieved on 2009-01-28
 Gallagher, M. (2004), "Between the Lines." In Electronic Musician Magazine, 1 February 2004. 
 Bencina, R. (2006) "Creative Software Development: Reflections on AudioMulch Practice." In Digital Creativity, Routledge, Vol. 17, no. 1, pp. 11 – 24. 
 Bencina, R. (1998), "Oasis Rose the Composition - Real-Time DSP with AudioMulch," Proceedings of the Australasian Computer Music Conference, ANU Canberra, pp. 85–92.
 Cleveland, B. (2007), "Erdem Helvacioglu". In Guitar Player, September 2007, pp. 32–33. 
 Frere-Jones, S. (2008), "Re-Start: Laptops go Live". In The New Yorker, 15 September 2008, pp. 94–95.

External links
 

C++ software
Audio editors
Software synthesizers